Moussa Djoumoi (born 16 July 1999) is a footballer who plays as a forward for Swiss Promotion League club Stade Nyonnais. Born in Mayotte, he plays for the Comoros national team.

Club career 
In 2008, Djoumoi began his youth career at FC Lyon in France where he remained for eight seasons, before joining the youth setup of Olympique Lyonnais in 2016. He moved to Saint-Priest one year later, where he played three games in the National 2. After one season, Djoumoi played for the reserve team of Angers in the National 3, scoring a goal in 12 games, before returning to Saint-Priest in 2019.

After his contract had expired in June 2022, Djoumoi joined Stade Nyonnais in the Swiss Promotion League on 8 August.

International career 
Djoumoi made his senior international debut for Comoros in a 2021 FIFA Arab Cup qualification match against Palestine, scoring his side's lone goal in a 5–1 defeat. He was part of the Comoros squad that first took part in the Africa Cup of Nations in 2021.

Career statistics

International 

Scores and results list Comoros' goal tally first, score column indicates score after each Djoumoi goal.

References

External links
 
 
 

1999 births
Living people
Mayotte footballers
Comorian footballers
French footballers
French sportspeople of Comorian descent
Association football forwards
FC Lyon players
Olympique Lyonnais players
AS Saint-Priest players
Angers SCO players
FC Stade Nyonnais players
Championnat National 2 players
Championnat National 3 players
Swiss Promotion League players
Comoros international footballers
2021 Africa Cup of Nations players
Comorian expatriate footballers
Comorian expatriate sportspeople in Switzerland
French expatriate footballers
French expatriate sportspeople in Switzerland
Expatriate footballers in Switzerland